The highest-selling albums in Japan are ranked in the weekly Oricon Albums Chart, which is published by Oricon Style magazine. The data are compiled by Oricon based on each albums' weekly physical sales. This list includes the albums that reached the number one place on that chart in 1991. In 1991, 32 albums occupied the peak position on the chart.

Yumi Matsutoya's twenty-second studio album The Gates of Heaven became the best-selling album of 1991 despite not reaching number one during the year. The album achieved two weeks atop the chart in 1990.

Chart history

References

1991 record charts
Lists of number-one albums in Japan
1991 in Japanese music